A palette , in the original sense of the word, is a rigid, flat surface on which a painter arranges and mixes paints. A palette is usually made of wood, plastic, ceramic, or other hard, inert, nonporous material, and can vary greatly in size and shape. The most commonly known type of painter's palette is made of a thin wood board designed to be held in the artist's hand and rest on the artist's arm.
Watercolor palettes are generally made of plastic or porcelain with rectangular or wheel format with built in wells and mixing areas for colors.

Palettes are also a universal symbol of painting and art in general, alongside paintbrushes, for example in the symbol of Microsoft Paint.

See also 

 Palette (computing)
 Color scheme
 Palette knife

External links
 Palette, Online Etymology Dictionary
 Color palette

Painting materials
Archaeological palettes